The phrase "Armor of God" (panoplian tou Theou) is derived from Ephesians 6:11: "Put on the whole armour of God, that ye may be able to stand against the wiles of the devil." (King James Version). As a biblical reference, the metaphor may refer to physical armour worn by God in metaphorical battles, or it may refer to vigilant righteousness in general as bestowed by the grace of God (Romans , King James Version): "The night is far spent, the day is at hand: let us therefore cast off the works of darkness, and let us put on the armour of light."

Quotes

The full quote as outlined in the King James Bible, is from Paul the Apostle's letter to the Ephesians :

Given the many points of contact between the Book of Wisdom and Paul's writings (particularly his Epistle to the Romans), it is perhaps unsurprising that the imagery of the Armor of God would be used here.  Compare the various elements of the whole armor of God mentioned in the epistle to the Ephesians to Wisdom 5:17–20:

Context
Other related passages, by Paul and references by later theologians, indicate a metaphorical context for the Armor of God. For instance, Paul's letter to the Romans indicates not a literal, but a figurative, application of the concept (Romans , New International Version):

In terms of the parts of the Armor of God, the various pieces (the belt of truth, the breastplate of righteousness, the shoes of the gospel of peace, the shield of faith, the helmet of salvation, and the sword of the Spirit) are correlated to what Paul would have witnessed firsthand as the arms and armor of Roman legionaries during his life in the Roman Empire.

Interpretations
In biblical exegesis, the vast majority of biblical scholars, Catholic, Protestant, and otherwise, agree that Paul used the concept as a reference to spiritual battle with the Devil.  Christians are to put on this armor and deal well with its upkeeping. This armor seems to be in direct correlation of that of the Roman Empire's soldiers.

Pieces of armor
The following biblical texts in Ephesians chapter 6 mention six pieces of armor: 

 belt 
 breastplate (θώραξ, thorax)
 footwear 
 shield (θυρεὸς, thyreos)
 helmet (περικεφαλαία, perikephalaia)
 sword (μάχαιρα, machaira)

These pieces are described in Ephesians as follows: loins girt with truth (belt of truth), breastplate of righteousness, shoes with the preparation of the gospel of peace (peace), shield of faith, helmet of salvation, and the sword of the spirit/word of God.

The helmet of Salvation and the breastplate of Righteousness also appear in Isaiah 59:17.

See also
 Bibleman
 Miles Christianus
 New Testament military metaphors
 Shield of the Trinity
 Soldiers of Christ, Arise
 Territorial spirit

References

Bibliography
 

New Testament words and phrases
Metaphors referring to objects
Metaphors referring to war and violence